Communities in the United States with large West Indian populations.

Connecticut

Bloomfield, Connecticut
Blue Hills, Connecticut

Florida
Carol City, Florida
Coconut Creek, Florida
Coral Springs, Florida
Cutler Bay, Florida
Fort Lauderdale, Florida
Hallandale Beach, Florida
Hialeah, Florida
Hollywood, Florida
Homestead, Florida
Kendall, Florida
Kissimmee, Florida
Lake Worth, Florida
Lauderdale Lakes, Florida
Lauderhill, Florida
Little Haiti, Miami, Florida
Little Havana, Miami, Florida
Margate, Florida
Miami, Florida
Miami Gardens, Florida
Miramar, Florida
North Lauderdale, Florida
North Miami Beach, Florida
Oakland Park, Florida
Orlando, Florida
Pembroke Park, Florida
Pembroke Pines, Florida
Plantation, Florida
Pompano Beach, Florida
Port Saint Lucie, Florida
Sunrise, Florida
Tamarac, Florida
Tampa, Florida
West Palm Beach, Florida
West Park, Florida
Ybor City, Florida

Georgia
parts of Atlanta, Georgia
Clarkston, Georgia
Lithonia, Georgia
Stone Mountain, Georgia

Maryland

Park Heights, Baltimore

Massachusetts

Dorchester, Boston
"Little Jamaica", Boston, Massachusetts
Mattapan, Massachusetts
Milton, Massachusetts
Randolph, Massachusetts
Somerville, Massachusetts
Brockton, Massachusetts
Hyde Park, Massachusetts
Roxbury, Massachusetts

New York
Westbury, New York
Bedford–Stuyvesant, Brooklyn
Crown Heights, Brooklyn
East Flatbush, Brooklyn
Flatbush, Brooklyn
Canarsie, Brooklyn
Elmont, New York
Jamaica, Queens
Kew Gardens, Queens
Lakeview, New York
Laurelton, Queens
Mount Vernon, New York
Richmond Hill, Queens
Roosevelt, New York
Schenectady, New York
Springfield Gardens, Queens
Uniondale, New York
Valley Stream, New York
Wakefield, Bronx
Williamsbridge, Bronx

Texas
Greater Houston has about 60,000 Jamaicans

References

Caribbean American
West Indian communities in the United States
Ethnic enclaves in the United States